Local elections were held in Norway on 14 September 2015. Voters elected representatives to municipal and county councils, which are responsible for education, public transport, health, and elderly care, and for the levy of certain taxes. The Labour Party became the largest party, gaining 33% of the vote, while the nationally governing Conservative and Progress parties suffered losses relative to their performances in the 2013 parliamentary and 2011 local elections.

Term of office was 1 January 2016 until 31 December 2019.

The results meant that the Conservatives were set to lose control of Norway's two most populous cities, Oslo and Bergen.

In Tromsø the Red Party garnered a record 14.4% of the votes. They formed a majority along with the Labour Party and the Socialist Left Party, and chose to phase out the local parliamentary system.

Results

Norwegian local results

Municipal

County councils

References

External links
 NRK: Valgresultater (election results) 2015 (in Norwegian)

2015
2015
2015 elections in Europe
2015 in Norway
September 2015 events in Europe